Lee Williams (born 3 April 1974) is a British actor and former model from Bangor, Wales. He is best known for his role as Scott LeTissier in the Channel 4 comedy series Boyz Unlimited. Williams was the face of French Connection TV, Calvin Klein jeans, Sisley, and has worked as a model for designers such as Vivienne Westwood and Calvin Klein.

Early life 
Lee Williams was born in Bangor, Wales. Early in his life he lived in Holyhead with his father Peter Durkan and his mother Elaine He then went to a comprehensive school in Warrington in England. He enrolled to study fine art and fashion at Central Saint Martin's College of Art and Fashion in London, he eventually dropped out in his 2nd year when he was nineteen and began working for Vivienne Westwood, where he helped in her designer shows in Paris; it was here that the photographer Steven Meisel encouraged Lee to pursue modelling.

Modelling 
Williams worked as a model for two and a half years at the time when the heroin chic look was in popular demand and was being popularised by Kate Moss, and used in Calvin Klein advertisements. He was tall, skinny, had long hair and looked androgynous; a perfect candidate to model. Williams worked in many big magazines and was used as a model for The Face, I-D, Arena, Vogue, Elle, L'uomo. He also worked with top photographers such as Mario Testino, Bruce Weber and David Bailey. He did campaigns for Calvin Klein and fashion shows for Versace and Dolce and Gabbana. During his modelling career he lived in Japan, New York City and Paris. He is on the cover of Suede's album 'Coming Up', photographed by Nick Knight.

Acting 
Williams was encouraged by his drama teacher to pursue acting, but instead chose to attend an art school in London, putting acting on hold. He auditioned for the role of Tom Riddle in the film Harry Potter and the Chamber of Secrets but lost out to Christian Coulson in the final stages. He has had several parts in films and television programmes. In 2011, he played Henry Mynors in Helen Edmundson's adaptation of Anna of the Five Towns on BBC Radio 4. The same year he appeared in Four Nights in Knaresborough (Morville) at the Southwark Playhouse.
Williams lives in Kent.

Filmography 
Grantchester (TV series) Episode #1.4 (2014)- Dominic Taylor
White Settlers (2014) – Ed
When Calls the Heart (2013) – Thomas Higgins
Delhi in a Day Feature Film – Jasper (2010)
The Tudors Robert Testwood (2009)
Hotel Babylon (2008) – Jack Harrison
Casualty (TV series) (2008–2011)-Brian
Lena: The Bride of Ice (2008) – Johnny
Kimono (2007) – Narrator
The Waiting Room – Brian
New Street Law – Joe Stevens (12 episodes, 2006–2007)
Miss Marie Lloyd – Queen of The Music Hall (2007) (TV) – Freddie
Popcorn (2007) – Emil
The Trial (TV) – Clay
No Angels – Patrick (2 episodes, 2006)
Ideal – Luke (4 episodes, 2007)
Coming Up (TV Series) (2006) – Clay
Stalking Pete Doherty (2005) (TV) – Narrator
Teachers  – Ewan Doherty (Series 4, 2004) (9 episodes)
Murder in Suburbia – Jamie Finch (1 episode, 2004)
The Debt (2003) (TV) – James Hilden
The Forsyte Saga: To Let (2003) (TV mini-series) – Jon Forsyte
The American Embassy – Drew Barkley (3 episodes, 2002)
No Night Is Too Long (2002) (TV) – Tim Cornish
Vallen (2001) – Lucas
Me Without You (2001) – Ben
In His Life: The John Lennon Story (2000) (TV) – Stuart Sutcliffe
Losing It (2000) (TV) – Jude
Urban Gothic – Carter (1 episode, 2000)
A Many Splintered Thing (2000) – Simon (unknown episodes)
Billy Elliot (2000) – Tutor 4
Canone Inverso (2000) – David Blau
Mauvaise passe (1999) – Customer in Cafe
Elephant Juice (1999) – George
Boyz Unlimited (1999) – Scott LeTissier (unknown episodes)
The Wolves of Kromer (1998) – Seth
Still Crazy (1998) – Young Keith
Macbeth on the Estate (1998) (TV) – Weird Child

External links
BBC Drama faces Lee Williams
Mini-profiles Lee Williams

References

1974 births
Living people
Welsh male television actors
People from Bangor, Gwynedd
Welsh male models